Bhadrabahu may refer to:
 Bhadrabahu
 Bhadrabahu II
 Bhadrabahu III